The Louville V. Niles House is a historic house in Somerville, Massachusetts.  This 2.5-story wood-frame house was built in 1890 by Louville Niles, a developer and Boston merchant.  It is one of the last houses built in the main development phase of the Prospect Hill area.  The building has a roughly rectangular massing, with several projecting sections and gables on the roof line, and a decorative chimney top.  The front porch has a shed roof on top of spindlework and turned posts.

The house was listed on the National Register of Historic Places in 1989.

See also
Louville Niles House, Niles' own house on Walnut Street
National Register of Historic Places listings in Somerville, Massachusetts

References

Houses on the National Register of Historic Places in Somerville, Massachusetts
Houses completed in 1890